Robert W. Wirch (born November 16, 1943) is an American politician serving as a Democratic member of the Wisconsin State Senate, representing the 22nd district since 1997. He previously served in the Wisconsin State Assembly from 1993 through 1997.

Early life and education
Wirch was born in Kenosha, Wisconsin, and graduated from Bradford High School. He received a bachelor's degree from the University of Wisconsin–Parkside in 1970 and served in the United States Army Reserve from 1965 to 1971.

Career 
He served as a member of the Board of Supervisors for Kenosha County from 1986 to 1994.

Wisconsin legislature
In 1992, Wirch was elected to the Wisconsin State Assembly and was re-elected in 1994. In 1996, Wirch chose to run for Wisconsin Senate in the seat vacated by retiring senator Joseph F. Andrea. Wirch was elected to the Senate in 1996 and has been reelected six times, including his 2004 victory over future White House Chief of Staff Reince Priebus, and his 2011 victory against a recall attempt. He served as the Democratic Minority Caucus Chairperson from 2003 to 2005.

2011 Wisconsin protests

On February 20, 2011, it was reported that Wirch, along with 13 other Democratic Wisconsin State Senators, had left the state, allegedly to deny the State Senate a quorum on Governor Scott Walker's Budget Repair legislation. The Budget Repair bill later passed.

2011 recall attempt

On February 24, 2011, Taxpayers to Recall Robert Wirch officially registered with the Wisconsin Government Accountability Board as a result of the 2011 Wisconsin protests. 13,537 valid signatures of electors residing within the 22nd District had to be collected by April 25, 2011, to generate a recall election.
On April 21, Taxpayers to Recall Robert Wirch filed 18,300 signatures with Wisconsin's Government Accountability Board. On August 16, 2011, Wirch won 57% of the vote in a recall election, defeating Republican Jonathan Steitz.

Personal life
Wirch resides in Pleasant Prairie, Wisconsin. Mary, his wife of 47 years, died on February 23, 2020, from complications related to gall bladder cancer. They have a son, David, and a daughter, Julia.

Electoral history

Wisconsin Assembly (1992-1994)

| colspan="6" style="text-align:center;background-color: #e9e9e9;"| Primary Election

| colspan="6" style="text-align:center;background-color: #e9e9e9;"| General Election

| colspan="6" style="text-align:center;background-color: #e9e9e9;"| Primary Election

| colspan="6" style="text-align:center;background-color: #e9e9e9;"| General Election

Wisconsin Senate (1996-2016)

| colspan="6" style="text-align:center;background-color: #e9e9e9;"| Primary Election

| colspan="6" style="text-align:center;background-color: #e9e9e9;"| General Election

| colspan="6" style="text-align:center;background-color: #e9e9e9;"| Primary Election

| colspan="6" style="text-align:center;background-color: #e9e9e9;"| General Election

| colspan="6" style="text-align:center;background-color: #e9e9e9;"| Primary Election

| colspan="6" style="text-align:center;background-color: #e9e9e9;"| General Election

| colspan="6" style="text-align:center;background-color: #e9e9e9;"| Primary Election

| colspan="6" style="text-align:center;background-color: #e9e9e9;"| General Election

| colspan="6" style="text-align:center;background-color: #e9e9e9;"| Primary Election

| colspan="6" style="text-align:center;background-color: #e9e9e9;"| General Election

| colspan="6" style="text-align:center;background-color: #e9e9e9;"| Primary Election

| colspan="6" style="text-align:center;background-color: #e9e9e9;"| General Election

| colspan="6" style="text-align:center;background-color: #e9e9e9;"| Primary Election

| colspan="6" style="text-align:center;background-color: #e9e9e9;"| General Election

| colspan="6" style="text-align:center;background-color: #e9e9e9;"| Primary Election

| colspan="6" style="text-align:center;background-color: #e9e9e9;"| General Election

References

External links
Senator Robert Wirch at the Wisconsin State Legislature
Bob Wirch for State Senate official campaign site
Wisconsin Historical Society-Robert W. Wirch
 
Campaign 2008 campaign contributions at Wisconsin Democracy Campaign
22nd Senate District, Senator Wirch in the Wisconsin Blue Book (2005–2006)

1943 births
Living people
County supervisors in Wisconsin
Democratic Party members of the Wisconsin State Assembly
Democratic Party Wisconsin state senators
Politicians from Kenosha, Wisconsin
University of Wisconsin–Parkside alumni
21st-century American politicians
People from Pleasant Prairie, Wisconsin
Mary D. Bradford High School alumni